Kampung Laut Mosque is one of the oldest mosques in Malaysia. There is no confirmatory evidence when the building of the mosque took place. It is estimated to have been built sometime in the 15th century or 18th century. It is located on Jalan Kuala Krai, in Nilam Puri, Tumpat District, Kelantan.

History 
Masjid Kampung Laut is estimated to have been built in the 15th century, by a group of Champa government transporters; from the Kingdom of Champa. Its style is largely typical of local traditional architecture, and is climate-appropriate, similar to local houses in the area. The style is also remnant of a once culturally southern Indian Hindu architecture.  The original mosque had a basic architectural style and structure: with four pillars for the foundation and palm fronds for the roof.

By virtue of architectural resemblance, it is said that the mosque was the original Masjid Agung Demak that was built in 1401. The mosque was relocated from its original site to Kampung Laut (hence the name). However, there was no strong evidence to support this.

During the reign of the Kelantan Sultanate between 1859 and 1900, the mosque became an important meeting point for the sultans and religious leaders. The mosque was also used as a trading post. During this period, the mosque was expanded and upgraded with 20 pillars, a three-tiered roof, a tower (for muezzin to call for prayers), an attic, and a water tank while the flooring was made of well quality timber. The mosque was handed over to the Kelantan Government under Menteri Besar Datuk Asri Muda's administration in May 1970.

Kampung Laut is considered a traditional area for gathering, as the tradition in the region dates back thousands of years.

Floods
It has survived two big floods that occurred in Kelantan, the first is in 1926 when a flood known as Bah Air Merah and another in 1966. The second flood severely damaged the Mosque when parts of the mosque close to the river were swept away by flood waters. However, the mosque was repaired subsequently.

See also
 Islam in Malaysia
 Islam in Southeast Asia

References

External links 

 Masjid Kampung Laut
 The architectural heritage of the Malay world: the traditional mosque

Mosques in Kelantan
Tumpat District